Font Awesome is a font and icon toolkit based on CSS and Less. As of 2020, Font Awesome was used by 38% of sites that use third-party font scripts, placing Font Awesome in second place after Google Fonts.

History

It was made by Dave Gandy for use with Bootstrap. Font Awesome can be downloaded from BootstrapCDN.

Font Awesome 5 was released on December 7, 2017, with 1,278 icons. Version 5 comes in two packages: Font Awesome Free and the proprietary Font Awesome Pro (available for a fee). The free versions (all releases up to 4 and the free version for 5) are available under the SIL Open Font License 1.1, Creative Commons Attribution 4.0, and MIT License.

Font Awesome 6 is the latest version which was released in February 2022. Users will be able to upload their own icons and receive more icons on top of the existing ones from Font Awesome 5.

On March 16, 2022, Font Awesome announced a collaboration with United Nations Office for the Coordination of Humanitarian Affairs (OCHA) for humanitarian icons in Font Awesome 6.1.

References

External links 
 
 
 

Typography
Open-source typefaces